Al Khidmat-e-Khalq Foundation J&K (AKKFJK) is an NGO charitable organization located in  Hardukichroo , Aishmuquam District Anantnag that Provides Financial Help to the weaker Sections of the Society. Arranging Seminars, Debates, and Quizzes.

History
It was founded in 2021 by  Ishtiyaq Rashid  Mohammed Umer Ganie Hardukichroo

Services
AL KHIDMAT-E-KHALQ FOUNDATION J&K” is the registered NGO which works for :

1.	 Providing financial assistance to meritorious students who are not financially sound to continue their education.

2.	 Arranging seminars, workshops, debates, quiz, camps, symposiums, conferences, public meetings, street plays and charity shows.

3.	Fighting against exploitation, injustice and corruption if found against any individual, class, community in the society.

4.	Arranging mass charity programmes for providing financial help to the weaker section of the society especially to orphans, handicapped, widows and youth.

5.	Guiding and awaking the people about the various progressive educational, health and other welfare programmes.

Education 

AKKFJK makes Education programs strive to improve the literacy rate and quality of education in Kashmir .
The innovative methodology for the education of children at risk aims to toughen formal and transitional schooling programmes.

Health

References